Zlogosh Passage (‘Protok Zlogosh’ \'pro-tok 'zlo-gosh\) is the 320 m wide passage in the Palmer Archipelago between Davis Island on the south and Chauveau Point, Liège Island on the north.  It connects Bouquet Bay and Gerlache Strait, another connection between the two being Sumer Passage.

The passage is named after the settlement of Zlogosh in Western Bulgaria.

Location
British mapping in 1978.

Maps
 British Antarctic Territory.  Scale 1:200000 topographic map.  DOS 610 Series, Sheet W 64 62.  Directorate of Overseas Surveys, UK, 1980.
 Antarctic Digital Database (ADD). Scale 1:250000 topographic map of Antarctica. Scientific Committee on Antarctic Research (SCAR). Since 1993, regularly upgraded and updated.

References

 Bulgarian Antarctic Gazetteer. Antarctic Place-names Commission. (details in Bulgarian, basic data in English)
 Zlogosh Passage. SCAR Composite Antarctic Gazetteer.

External links
 Zlogosh Passage. Copernix satellite image

Straits of the Palmer Archipelago
Bulgaria and the Antarctic
Liège Island